Reykjavík South is one of the six multi-member constituencies of the Althing, the national legislature of Iceland. The constituency was established in 2003 when the existing Reykjavík constituency was split into two. The constituency currently elects nine of the 63 members of the Althing using the open party-list proportional representation electoral system. At the 2021 parliamentary election it had 45,716 registered electors.

Electoral system
Reykjavík South currently elects nine of the 63 members of the Althing using the open party-list proportional representation electoral system. Constituency seats are allocated using the D'Hondt method. Compensatory seats (equalisation seas) are calculated based on the national vote and are allocated using the D'Hondt method at the constituency level. Only parties that reach the 5% national threshold compete for compensatory seats.

Election results

Summary

(Excludes compensatory seats.)

Detailed

2021
Results of the 2021 parliamentary election held on 25 September 2021:

The following candidates were elected:
Arndís Anna K. Gunnarsdóttir (P), 2,904.25 votes; Áslaug Arna Sigurbjörnsdóttir (D), 7,990.50 votes; Birgir Ármannsson (D), 5,391.67 votes; Björn Leví Gunnarsson (P), 3,865.25 votes; Hanna Katrín Friðriksson (C), 3,056.67 votes; Hildur Sverrisdóttir (D), 6,719.17 votes; Inga Sæland (F), 3,168.00 votes; Kristrún Mjöll Frostadóttir (S), 4,714.33 votes; Lilja Dögg Alfreðsdóttir (B), 4,041.00 votes; Orri Páll Jóhannsson (V), 3,926.50 votes; and Svandís Svavarsdóttir (V), 5,127.50 votes.

2017
Results of the 2017 parliamentary election held on 28 October 2017:

The following candidates were elected:
Ágúst Ólafur Ágústsson (S), 4,634.00 votes; Björn Leví Gunnarsson (P), 3,050.75 votes; Brynjar Níelsson (D), 5,884.75 votes; Hanna Katrín Friðriksson (C), 3,035.67 votes; Inga Sæland (F), 2,912.00 votes; Kolbeinn Óttarsson Proppé (V), 5,056.25 votes; Lilja Dögg Alfreðsdóttir (B), 2,894.33 votes; Sigríður Á. Andersen (D), 7,952.50 votes; Svandís Svavarsdóttir (V), 6,680.75 votes; Þórhildur Sunna Ævarsdóttir (P), 4,049.25 votes; and Þorsteinn B. Sæmundsson (M), 2,695.33 votes.

2016
Results of the 2016 parliamentary election held on 29 October 2016:

The following candidates were elected:
Ásta Guðrún Helgadóttir (P), 5,975.25 votes; Brynjar Níelsson (D), 7,399.33 votes; Gunnar Hrafn Jónsson (P), 4,515.50 votes; Hanna Katrín Friðriksson (C), 4,405.25 votes; Kolbeinn Óttarsson Proppé (V), 4,613.00 votes; Lilja Dögg Alfreðsdóttir (B), 2,555.00 votes; Nichole Leigh Mosty (A), 2,497.33 votes; Ólöf Nordal (D), 8,823.00 votes; Pawel Bartoszek (C), 3,322.75 votes; Sigríður Á. Andersen (D), 5,957.67 votes; and Svandís Svavarsdóttir (V), 6,080.75 votes.

2013
Results of the 2013 parliamentary election held on 27 April 2013:

The following candidates were elected:
Guðlaugur Þór Þórðarson (D), 5,957.7 votes; Hanna Birna Kristjánsdóttir (D), 9,305.8 votes; Helgi Hjörvar (S), 3,729.3 votes; Jón Þór Ólafsson (Þ), 2,093.3 votes; Karl Garðarsson (B), 4,502.3 votes; Óttarr Proppé (A), 2,838.0 votes; Pétur Blöndal (D), 7,850.7 votes; Róbert Marshall (A), 3,698.8 votes; Sigríður Ingibjörg Ingadóttir (S), 4,943.0 votes; Svandís Svavarsdóttir (V), 4,225.0 votes; and Vigdís Hauksdóttir (B), 5,701.5 votes.

2009
Results of the 2009 parliamentary election held on 25 April 2009:

The following candidates were elected:
Ásta Ragnheiður Jóhannesdóttir (S), 7,136.6 votes; Birgir Ármannsson (D), 5,489.3 votes; Birgitta Jónsdóttir (O), 3,017.7 votes; Guðlaugur Þór Þórðarson (D), 6,269.2 votes; Lilja Mósesdóttir (V), 6,048.0 votes; Ólöf Nordal (D), 6,999.5 votes; Össur Skarphéðinsson (S), 10,363.1 votes; Sigríður Ingibjörg Ingadóttir (S), 10,310.2 votes; Skúli Helgason (S), 8,807.0 votes; Svandís Svavarsdóttir (V), 8,062.2 votes; and Vigdís Hauksdóttir (B), 3,390.7 votes.

2007
Results of the 2007 parliamentary election held on 12 May 2007:

The following candidates were elected:
Ágúst Ólafur Ágústsson (S), 8,522.7 votes; Álfheiður Ingadóttir (V), 3,802.5 votes; Ásta Möller (D), 9,865.7 votes; Ásta Ragnheiður Jóhannesdóttir (S), 6,826.5 votes; Birgir Ármannsson (D), 8,551.3 votes; Björn Bjarnason (D), 10,187.1 votes; Geir Haarde (D), 13,822.4 votes; Illugi Gunnarsson (D), 11,310.3 votes; Ingibjörg Sólrún Gísladóttir (S), 10,090.2 votes; Jón Magnússon (F), 2,341.3 votes; and Kolbrún Halldórsdóttir (V), 4,941.5 votes.

2003
Results of the 2003 parliamentary election held on 10 May 2003:

The following candidates were elected:
Ágúst Ólafur Ágústsson (S), 7,705.1 votes; Ásta Ragnheiður Jóhannesdóttir (S), 10,714.8 votes; Birgir Ármannsson (D), 8,458.3 votes; Geir Haarde (D), 13,999.1 votes; Guðmundur Hallvarðsson (D), 9,839.0 votes; Jóhanna Sigurðardóttir (S), 12,199.1 votes; Jónína Bjartmarz (B), 4,150.7 votes; Mörður Árnason (S), 9,093.1 votes; Ögmundur Jónasson (U), 3,420.3 votes; Pétur Blöndal (D), 12,459.1 votes; and Sólveig Pétursdóttir (D), 10,816.3 votes.

References

2003 establishments in Iceland
Althing constituencies
Constituencies established in 2003
Althing constituency, South